Lac-à-la-Tortue Ecological Reserve is an ecological reserve in Quebec, Canada. It was established on May 27, 1992.

External links
 Official website from Government of Québec

References

Protected areas of Mauricie
Nature reserves in Quebec
Protected areas established in 1992
Shawinigan
1992 establishments in Quebec